The Estate of Hugh Naish Act 1737 (11 Geo 2 c 38) was a public Act of the Parliament of Great Britain confirming articles of agreement between Hugh Naish and trustees (named in the Act) concerning the real and personal estates of Hugh Naish. His son Hugh, (Middle Temple, 1724) was committed to the Fleet Prison for debt on 29 June 1731 and found it best to stay there to avoid payment. An Act was passed allowing creditors from 1 January 1736 to obtain the release of prisoners who could pay, but when they required the Warden of the Fleet to produce Hugh junior (9 July 1737) he escaped ‘beyond seas’.

This Act was repealed by the Statute Law Revision Act 1948.

See also the private Act 21 Geo.2 c.20 (1747), allowing them to proceed against his estate, apart from an agreement of 6 December 1733 between Hugh senior's executors and creditor Edward Spelman.

Great Britain Acts of Parliament 1737
Repealed Great Britain Acts of Parliament